The 2014 Idol Star Athletics Championships (Hangul: 아이돌스타 육상 양궁 풋살 컬링 선수권대회) was held at Jamsil Arena in Seoul, South Korea on January 7, 2014 and was broadcast on MBC on January 9 and 10, 2014. At the championships, a total number of 10 events (6 in athletics, 2 in archery and in curling, futsal 1 each) were contested: 5 by men and 5 by women. There were over 230 K-pop singers and celebrities who participated, divided into 8 teams.

Results

Men 

Athletics

Archery

Football

Women 

Athletics

Archery

Curling

Mixed

Ratings

References

External links
2014 Idol Star Athletics Championships official MBC website 

MBC TV original programming
South Korean variety television shows
South Korean game shows
2014 in South Korean television
Idol Star Athletics Championships